Jacob Leicht (August 2, 1919 – May 18, 1992) was an American football halfback in the All-America Football Conference (AAFC) for the Baltimore Colts. He played college football at the University of Oregon and was drafted in the tenth round of the 1946 NFL Draft by the Washington Redskins.

See also
 List of NCAA major college yearly punt and kickoff return leaders

External links

1919 births
1992 deaths
American football defensive backs
American football halfbacks
Baltimore Colts (1947–1950) players
Oregon Ducks football players
People from Jamestown, North Dakota